Ivan Kostić (Serbian Cyrillic: Иван Костић; born 24 June 1989) is a Serbian professional footballer who plays as an defender.

Honours
Tuzla City 
First League of FBiH: 2017–18

References

External links
Ivan Kostić at fknapredak.rs

1989 births
Living people
Sportspeople from Niš
Serbian footballers
Serbian SuperLiga players
Premier League of Bosnia and Herzegovina players
First League of the Federation of Bosnia and Herzegovina players
FK Banat Zrenjanin players
FK Mladost Lučani players
FK Napredak Kruševac players
FK Timok players
FK Borac Banja Luka players
FK Sloboda Tuzla players
FK Željezničar Sarajevo players
FK Tuzla City players
Association football defenders